Songs for Luca is a Celtic music and progressive rock album by Dave Bainbridge, the guitarist, keyboard player and founding member of Iona, released in 2003.

The album was made to provide financial support for the Bainbridges' young autistic son Luca. The musicians involved come from the Christian, progressive and Celtic music scenes.

Contributors
David Fitzgerald
Eden's Bridge
Troy Donockley
Dave Bainbridge
Peter Fairclough Group
Joanne Hogg
Nick Beggs
Mae McKenna
Frank Van Essen
Iona
Jeff Johnson
Debbie Bainbridge
Karnataka
Rick Wakeman
Terl Bryant
Julie Tippetts
Adrian Snell
Maíre Brennan
Gentle Giant
Dave Bainbridge/David Fitzgerald

Track listing
Disc 1 - Total Time 61:10
"Columba Aspexit" – 4:28 (by David Fitzgerald)
"Open Sea" – 6:52 (by Eden's Bridge)
"Sights" – 3:13 (by Troy Donockley)
"In The Wake Of Colmcille" – 4:57 (by Dave Bainbridge)
"Shepherd Wheel" – 7:23 (Peter Fairclough Group)
"King's Prayer" – 3:52 (The Flower Kings)
"Brightest And Best" – 3:52 (by Joanne Hogg)
"For Luca" – 2:28 (by Nick Beggs)
"Whistlin'" – 2:53 (by Mae McKenna)
"Ester" – 5:12 (by Frank Van Essen)
"Beijing" - The Widescreen Remix – 5:17 (by Iona)
"I'll Look For You" – 6:06 (Jeff Johnson)
"Starlit Garden" – 1:55 (by Debbie Bainbridge)

Disc 2 - Total Time 71:53
After The Rain – 7:46 (by Karnataka)
Morning Has Broken – 3:12 (by Rick Wakeman)
My Song Is Love Unknown – 4:50 (by Terl Bryant)
Labyrinth – 7:50 (by Frank Van Essen)
Lament – 4:18 (by Julie Tippetts)
Man-Live In Tokyo – 11:55 (by Iona)
Like Father Like Son – 5:39 (by Adrian Snell)
Misty Eyes Adventures – 5:34 (by Maíre Brennan)
Forever In My Heart – 3:15 (by Nick Beggs)
Aspirations – 4:57 (by Gentle Giant)
Ca' The Ewes – 5:50 (by Mae McKenna)
Open My Eyes - Reprise (live Norwich Cathedral) – 3:44 (by Dave Bainbridge/David Fitzgerald)
Bright Flame – 3:10 (by Debbie Bainbridge)

Release details
2003, UK, Open Sky Records OPENVP999CD, Release Date 27 October 2003, CD

Iona (band) albums
2003 albums